Mazarandeh (also Romanized as Mazārandeh and Mezārandeh) is a village in Abezhdan Rural District, Abezhdan District, Andika County, Khuzestan Province, Iran. At the 2006 census, its population was 80, in 13 families.

References 

Populated places in Andika County